Ukraine competed at the 1998 Winter Paralympics in Nagano, Japan. 11 competitors from Ukraine won 9 medals including 3 gold, 2 silver and 4 bronze and finished 14th in the medal table.

See also 
 Ukraine at the Paralympics
 Ukraine at the 1998 Winter Olympics

References 

1998
1998 in Ukrainian sport
Nations at the 1998 Winter Paralympics